A amoebic liver abscess is a type of liver abscess caused by amebiasis.  It is the involvement of liver tissue by trophozoites of the organism Entamoeba histolytica and of its abscess due to necrosis.

Presentation
Approximately 90% of patients with E histolytica are asymptomatic. The two most common manifestations of E histolytica include colitis (bloody stool with mucus, abdominal pain, and/or diarrhea), and discovery of a liver abscess on imaging. Liver abscess' commonly present as right upper quadrant abdominal pain and fever, with worsening features associated with abscess rupture.

Symptoms
 Pain right hypochondrium referred to the right shoulder
 Pyrexia (100.4 F)
 Profuse sweating and rigors
 Loss of weight
 Earthy complexion

Signs
 Pallor
 Tenderness and rigidity in right hypochondrium
 Palpable liver
 Intercostal tenderness
 Basal lung signs

Diagnosis
Diagnosis is primarily made by identifying stool ova and parasites on stool antigen testing in the presence of colitis, or E histolytica serology.
 Blood ceruloplasmin
 Haemoglobin estimation
 Stools examination (trophozoites and cysts)
 Radiography
 Aspiration exploratory
 Medical ultrasonography and CT scanning
 Sigmoidoscopy
 Liver function tests
 Serological tests

Treatment

Research

Due to the difficulty of exploring host and amebic factors involved in the pathogenesis of amebic liver abscess in humans, most studies have been conducted with animal models (e.g., mice, gerbils, and hamsters). Histopathological findings revealed that the chronic phase of amebic liver abscess in humans corresponds to lytic or liquefactive necrosis, whereas in rodent models there is granulomatous inflammation. However, the use of animal models has provided important information on molecules and mechanisms of the host/parasite interaction in amebic liver abscess.

References

External links 

Intestinal infectious diseases